Seyed Mehran Mousavi (born 20 April 1991) is an Iranian football player who currently plays for Foolad in the Persian Gulf Pro League.

Honours
Foolad
Hazfi Cup: 2020–21
Iranian Super Cup: 2021

References

1991 births
Living people
Iranian footballers
Association football defenders
Shahrdari Tabriz players
Shahrdari Ardabil players
Rah Ahan players
Paykan F.C. players
People from Karaj
21st-century Iranian people